Chandar Bhan Brahman also known as Chandra Bhan and Chandrabhan was an Indian poet of the Persian language born in Lahore of the Mughal Empire. His date of birth is unknown; he probably died in the year 1662–63 . He belonged to a Brahman family, and chose "Brahman" as his pen name.  His father Dharam Das was a government official in the Mughal service. Brahman served as a secretary (Munshi) to the Mughal emperor Shah Jahan (1628–1658).

As a poet, Chandar Bhan managed to write very complex metaphors in an otherwise very straightforward language. Chandar Bhan's pen-name "Brahman" allowed for ingenius wordplay because of the use of "idol" (Persian but, sanam) as a metaphor of the - human or Divine - beloved, and as the lover as "idol worshipper". By his time, the Persian Muslim lover  calling himself an idol-worshipper with tongue in cheek (even when he/she meant the love of God) had become a cliché already, but Chandar Bhan added a new twist to it because it was also fact with him.

Brahman was influenced by and developed a strong respect for dervishes and yogis. Mughal emperor Shah Jahan was very impressed by Barahman's knowledge of Persian literature, calligraphy and Persian poetry. Brahman was appointed as court secretary and he was given responsibility for maintaining Shah Jahan's personal diary. He wrote a long essay in four chapters, the Chahar Chaman ("The Fourfold Flowerbed"), with chapter three containing his memoirs. Other topics are the daily routine of the emperor, the provinces of India, and philosophical ideas. He also edited a selection of his letters, the Munshi'at-i Barahman (Letters of Brahman), which contain letters to the royal family, to nobles (and some Sufis), to poets, letters of recommendation, and letters to his father.

Notes

Bibliography

External links
   Ahwaal o Aasar-e Chandrabhan Brahman va Divan e Parsi (Farsi) - Life and works of Chandar Bhan Brahman and his collected Persian poetry

Year of birth unknown
Date of birth unknown
1660s deaths
Year of death uncertain
17th-century Indian poets
People from Lahore
Persian-language poets